Annette Markert (born in Kaltensundheim, Thuringia) is a German classical mezzo-soprano and alto.

Career 
Annette Markert studied voice at the Leipzig School of Music and was engaged at the Halle Opera House in Halle, Saxony-Anhalt from 1983 to 1990, then at the opera house in Leipzig.

From 1996 she has worked as a free-lance artist in concert and opera, with the New York Philharmonic under Kurt Masur, the Vienna Philharmonic under Philippe Herreweghe, and the Internationale Bachakademie Stuttgart under Helmuth Rilling, among others. She sang Bach's Mass in B minor in London, conducted by Sir Roger Norrington, in memory of the 250th anniversary of the composer's death. She has performed annually with the Thomanerchor and the Dresdner Kreuzchor and took part in the project of Ton Koopman to record the complete vocal works of Bach with the Amsterdam Baroque Orchestra & Choir. In 2004, she appeared at the Rheingau Musik Festival in a recorded performance of Handel's Messiah. 

On the opera stage, she has interpreted the title roles of such Handel operas as Floridante, Rinaldo, Oreste and Giulio Cesare.

In 2008, she recorded in the Frauenkirche Dresden the Christmas Oratorio of Gottfried August Homilius and Christian August Jacobi's Der Himmel steht uns wieder offen, with Christiane Kohl, Marcus Ullmann, Tobias Berndt, Sächsisches Vocalensemble and Virtuosi Saxoniae, conducted by Ludwig Güttler.

References

External links 
 Annette Markert on Balmer & Dixon Management
  Entries for recordings by Annette Markert on WorldCat
 Hochschule für Musik Leipzig (now: University of Music and Theatre) website

Operatic mezzo-sopranos
German opera singers
Living people
Year of birth missing (living people)